Drumlough is a village/townland in County Down, Northern Ireland, southwest of Rathfriland, and is located in the civil parish of Drumgath.

Drumlough Highland Pipe Band was formed in 1942 and although no longer competing at RSPBA competition level, some of its members play for other bands at Grades 2 and 4.

Drumlough Lake is a small fishery that is managed by Rathfriland Angling Club. The lake contains rainbow trout, pike, perch, rudd and european eel in summer months. Specimen pike have been caught in recent seasons.

See also 
List of villages in Northern Ireland
List of towns in Northern Ireland

References 
Drumlough Highland Pipe Band Rathfriland
Loughs Agency
NI Neighbourhood Information System

Villages in County Down
Townlands of County Down
Civil parish of Drumgath